Route 127 or Highway 127 can refer to multiple roads:

Canada
 New Brunswick Route 127
 Ontario Highway 127
 Prince Edward Island Route 127

Costa Rica
 National Route 127

India
 National Highway 127 (India)

Japan
 Japan National Route 127

United States
  U.S. Route 127
  Alabama State Route 127
  Arkansas Highway 127
  California State Route 127
  Colorado State Highway 127
  Connecticut Route 127
  Florida State Road 127 (former)
  County Road 127 (Baker County, Florida)
  Georgia State Route 127
  Illinois Route 127
  Illinois Route 127A (former)
  Indiana State Road 127
  Iowa Highway 127
  K-127 (Kansas highway) (former)
  Louisiana Highway 127
  Maine State Route 127
  Maryland Route 127 (former)
  Massachusetts Route 127
  Massachusetts Route 127A
  Minnesota State Highway 127 (former)
  Missouri Route 127
  New Hampshire Route 127
  County Route 127 (Bergen County, New Jersey)
  New Mexico State Road 127
  New York State Route 127
  County Route 127 (Cortland County, New York)
 County Route 127A (Cortland County, New York)
  County Route 127 (Erie County, New York)
  County Route 127 (Herkimer County, New York)
  County Route 127 (Monroe County, New York)
  County Route 127 (Montgomery County, New York)
  County Route 127 (Onondaga County, New York)
  County Route 127 (Steuben County, New York)
  County Route 127 (Tompkins County, New York)
  County Route 127 (Westchester County, New York)
  North Carolina Highway 127
  North Dakota Highway 127
  Ohio State Route 127 (1923-1927) (former)
  Oklahoma State Highway 127
  Pennsylvania Route 127
  South Carolina Highway 127
  South Dakota Highway 127
  Tennessee State Route 127
  Texas State Highway 127
  Texas State Highway Loop 127
  Farm to Market Road 127
  Utah State Route 127
  Vermont Route 127
  Virginia State Route 127
  Virginia State Route 127 (1928-1933) (former)
  Virginia State Route 127 (1933-1948) (former)
  Washington State Route 127
  West Virginia Route 127
  Wisconsin Highway 127

Territories
  Puerto Rico Highway 127